The Cameroonian forest shrew (Sylvisorex camerunensis) is a species of mammal in the family Soricidae. It is found in the Montane forests of Western Cameroon around Mount Oku and Lake Manengouba, and in Southeastern Nigeria in the Gotel Mountains or Adamawa Plateau.

The Type locality of the species is Lake Manengouba in Cameroon at  elevation.

References

Sylvisorex
Taxonomy articles created by Polbot
Mammals described in 1968
Taxa named by Henri Heim de Balsac